Stony Creek Mountain is a  mountain located west of the Hamlet of Coreys in Franklin County in the northeastern Adirondacks, in New York. It is named after the nearby Stony Creek Ponds and Stony Creek, which are located to the west. Ampersand Mountain is located east-northeast and Middle Saranac Lake is located north of Stony Creek Mountain.

References

Mountains of Franklin County, New York
Adirondacks
Mountains of New York (state)